Szondi or Szondy is a Hungarian language surname. It may refer to:

Gabriel Szondy (born 1951), Australian sport administrator
György Szondy (1500–1552), Hungarian soldier
István Szondy (born 1925), Hungarian athlete and equestrian
Léopold Szondi (1893–1986), Hungarian psychiatrist
Péter Szondi (1929–1971), German literary scholar
Sandor Szondi (1920–1997), Belgian politician

See also
Szondi test, a personality test in clinical psychology

Hungarian-language surnames